Jian Renzi (born 19 October 1991), also known as Joyce Jian, is a Chinese actress. She is known for her roles in My Sunshine (2015) and Game of Hunting (2017).

Early life and education 
Jian was born 19 October 1991 in Shenyang, Liaoning, China. She graduated from the Central Academy of Drama in 2014.

Career
Jian started her acting career in 2014 with the movie Fantasia. In the same year she started to gain popularity for her role in The Romance of the Condor Heroes. In 2015 she rose to fame starring as He Yimei in the television show My Sunshine. The show was a huge success in China gaining over 10 billion views online and won Audience's Favorite TV Series (Dragon TV) at the 1st China Television Drama Quality Ceremony.

In 2017, she starred alongside Hu Ge in the TV show Game of Hunting. Jian gained popularity due to the show and received positive reviews for her performance. She was cast in the wuxia drama Wen Tian Lu, and spy drama Autumn Cicada.

In 2018, Jian starred in the workplace drama Partners.

Filmography

Film

Television series

References

External links

1991 births
Living people
Actresses from Shenyang
Central Academy of Drama alumni
21st-century Chinese actresses
Chinese film actresses
Chinese television actresses